Aynho Park was a railway station serving the village of Aynho in Northamptonshire, England. It was on what is now known as the Chiltern Main Line.

History
Aynho Park was the northernmost of six new stations that the Great Western Railway provided when it opened the high-speed Bicester cut-off line between Ashendon Junction and Aynho Junction for passengers on 1 July 1910.

The line became part of the Western Region of British Railways on nationalisation in 1948. British Railways closed Aynho Park station in 1963. It was closed by British Railways in 1963.

The site today
Trains on the Chiltern Main Line pass the site.

Notes

References

External links
 Aynho station on navigable O. S. map

Railway stations in Great Britain opened in 1910
Railway stations in Great Britain closed in 1963
Disused railway stations in Northamptonshire
Former Great Western Railway stations
West Northamptonshire District